Mettler, or Mettler Station, is a heavily Hispanic, low-income unincorporated area and census-designated place in Kern County, California. The population was 90 at the 2020 census, down from 136 at the 2010 census. It is the place where motion picture actor James Dean received a traffic ticket on the last day of his life.

History

Founding
According to the publication California's Geographic Names, Mettler was founded in 1941, but an obituary of Clifford Alvin Mettler in The Bakersfield Californian reported that the settlement was founded by him, his father, William H. Mettler,  and his brother (unnamed) in the "late 1940s" in the Wheeler Ridge area, which settlement "later became known as Mettler Station."

James Dean
On September 30, 1955, motion picture actor James Dean was driving north on Highway U.S. 99 when he was stopped by California Highway Patrol officer O.V. Hunter and given a ticket for speeding. The officer wrote Mettler Station as the location of the infraction.

Geography

Demographics

2010
At the 2010 census Mettler had a population of 136. The racial makeup of Mettler was 74 (54.4%) White, 0 (0.0%) African American, 0 (0.0%) Native American, 0 (0.0%) Asian, 0 (0.0%) Pacific Islander, 43 (31.6%) from other races, and 19 (14.0%) from two or more races. Hispanic or Latino of any race were 109 people (80.1%).

The whole population lived in households, no one lived in non-institutionalized group quarters and no one was institutionalized.

There were 31 households, 17 (54.8%) had children under the age of 18 living in them, 17 (54.8%) were opposite-sex married couples living together, 8 (25.8%) had a female householder with no husband present, 2 (6.5%) had a male householder with no wife present.  There were 2 (6.5%) unmarried opposite-sex partnerships, and 0 (0%) same-sex married couples or partnerships. 4 households (12.9%) were one person and 1 (3.2%) had someone living alone who was 65 or older. The average household size was 4.39.  There were 27 families (87.1% of households); the average family size was 4.74.

The age distribution was 37 people (27.2%) under the age of 18, 24 people (17.6%) aged 18 to 24, 30 people (22.1%) aged 25 to 44, 34 people (25.0%) aged 45 to 64, and 11 people (8.1%) who were 65 or older.  The median age was 28.5 years. For every 100 females, there were 109.2 males.  For every 100 females age 18 and over, there were 130.2 males.

There were 36 housing units at an average density of 154.8 per square mile, of the occupied units 18 (58.1%) were owner-occupied and 13 (41.9%) were rented. The homeowner vacancy rate was 0%; the rental vacancy rate was 0%.  62 people (45.6% of the population) lived in owner-occupied housing units and 74 people (54.4%) lived in rental housing units.

2000
At the 2000 census 157 people lived in 31 households (37 housing units). The average household size was about five people. Mettler's population was about six years younger than California at large.

References

Newspapers
The Bakersfield Californian
The Mountain Enterprise

Census-designated places in Kern County, California
Populated places established in 1941
Census-designated places in California